Pradyumna  is the eldest son of the Hindu deities Krishna and his chief consort, Rukmini. He is considered to be one of the four vyuha avatars of Vishnu. According to the Bhagavata Purana, Pradyumna was the rebirth of Kamadeva, the god of love. The Mahabharata states that Pradyumna was a portion of Sanat Kumara.

The Harivamsa describes the chatur-vyuha, consisisting of the Vrishni heroes Vasudeva, Sankarsana, Pradyumna, and Aniruddha, that would later be the basis for the Vaishnava concept of primary quadrupled expansion, or avatara.

Pradyumna is also a name of the Hindu god Vishnu, mentioned to be one of the 24 Keshava Namas (names).

Birth and early life

Pradyumna was the son of Krishna and the sixty-first grandson of Adinarayana. His mother was Rukmini, whom Krishna had eloped with from Vidarbha during her swayamvara on her request. Pradyumna was born in Dvaraka. He was the reincarnation of the demigod Kamadeva, the deity having previously been burnt to ashes formerly by the fury of Shiva. 

According to the Bhagavata Purana, within 10 days of Pradyumna's birth, he was abducted by the asura Shambara. Recognising him as his foe, the asura threw him into the ocean. The infant was swallowed by a mighty fish, which was caught by fishermen and presented to Shambara, whose cooks cut it open in the kitchen, discovering a child. The child is given to Mayavati, who was the earthly incarnation of Rati. Recognising the son of Krishna as her divine consort, Rati fell in love with him once more. Years passed until Pradyumna flowered into adolescence, raised by Mayavati. When chastised by the deity for her amorous notions towards him, she explained to him the circumstances of his new birth. She bestowed Pradyumna with the mystic art of mahamaya, which dispelled all magic. The youth then summoned the asura to battle, where the latter first attacked him with a club, and followed with his daitya magic. Hundreds of weapons belonging to guhyakas, gandharvas, pisacas, and uragas (celestial snakes) were amassed to combat him, but all fell before the son of Krishna. Drawing his sharp-edged sword, he beheaded the asura. Accompanied with his wife, he descended upon the palace in Dvaraka like a cloud with lightning, the crowds of noble women mistaking his handsome countenance and bluish-black curling locks for Krishna himself. Rukmini, however, recognised him as her own son. Krishna manifested himself to the scene along with Vasudeva and Devaki, and together with the residents of Dvaraka, embraced the couple and rejoiced.

Marriages

Pradyumna's first wife was Mayavati, the incarnation of Kamadeva's wife Rati. At first, Pradyumna objected, but upon explanation, he realised that she was, in fact, his eternal consort. He also married Rukmavati, the daughter of his maternal uncle, Rukmi. It is said that Princess Rukmavati found his valour, comeliness, and charm beyond words, and insisted on marrying him at her swayamvara. With her, he fathered, Krishna's grandson and favourite, and also considered a vyuha avatar of Vishnu, Aniruddha. Prabhavati was an asura princess who she fell in love with Pradyumna, and so he eloped with her.

Role in Dvaraka

Soon, Pradyumna became a constant companion of his father Krishna and was well-liked by the people of Dvaraka. Pradyumna was a mighty Maharathi warrior. He possessed the extremely rare Vaishnavastra, which was one of the most powerful weapons in the universe. He was one of the very few people to know the secret of the Chakravyuha. According to the Mahabharata, Pradyumna trained Abhimanyu and the Upapandavas in warfare when the Pandavas were in exile. But Pradyumna did not participate in the Kurukshetra War as he went on a pilgrimage with his uncle Balarama and the other Yadavas. He was, however, an active participant in the Ashvamedha Yagna, which was later conducted by Yudhishthira.

Defence of Dvaraka
Pradyumna defended Dvaraka against Shalva, the king of the Shalva Kingdom, along with his father, uncle and brothers. In the Harivamsa, Pradyumna alone repelled the attack of Jarasandha.

Death
Pradyumna was later killed in an intoxicated brawl, along with all the other members of the Yadava clan. His grandson, Vajra, was the only survivor of Yadu lineage after this incident.

Epithets

One of the epithets of Pradyumna in literature, such as in Harivamsa 99, is "Makaradhvaja", meaning "he whose banner or standard is the crocodile". A pillar capital with the effigy of a Makara crocodile found at Besnagar near the Heliodorus pillar dedicated to Vasudeva, is also attributed to Pradyumna. In the Mahabharata, the Makara is associated with Krishna's son and Kamadeva, the God of Love, suggesting that they are identical.

Descendants
As per the Bhagavata Purana, Canto 10, Chapter 61, Aniruddha was the son of Pradyumna and Rukmavati. He was later abducted by Usha (daughter of Bana Daitya and granddaughter of Mahabali), who wished to marry him. Usha's father, Banasura, however, imprisoned Aniruddha, creating a battle between Krishna and Shiva. In the battle, Pradyumna defeated Shiva's son Kartikeya, who fled on his peacock. At the end of the war, Banasura lost, and Aniruddha and Usha were married. Aniruddha is said to have been very much like his grandfather Krishna, to the extent that some consider him to be a jana avatar, an avatar of Vishnu. Aniruddha's son was Vajra. Vajra was known to be an invincible warrior and was the only survivor of the Yadu Dynasty after the Yadus' battle. According to some sources, Vajra then had 16 idols of Krishna and other gods carved from a rare, imperishable stone called Braja and built temples to house these idols in and around Mathura so as to feel the presence of Krishna. It is said that Pradyumna and Arjuna were equivalent in their skills.

Texts 
The Hindu version of the history of Pradyumna is mentioned in Bhagavata Purana.

The Jain version of the story of Pradyumna is mentioned in the Pradyumna-charitra (poem in 18 canons) of Rajchandra, written in 1878 AD.

References

Sources

External links 

Characters in the Mahabharata
People related to Krishna
Forms of Vishnu
Characters_in_the_Bhagavata_Purana